Moșul (the old man or the eternal man), is a mysterious benevolent character, symbol of wisdom and prosperity in Romanian mythology. Some historians associate him with the ancient Dacian god Zamolxis, or with the Roman god Saturn.

Romanian mythology